Whitehaven is a Clinton family-owned mansion in Washington, D.C. used by Hillary Clinton when she is in residence in the capital. (The primary Clinton home is in Chappaqua, New York.) Built in 1951, the Georgian-style house is located near Washington's Embassy Row. Past residents have included Sir David Muirhead, Henry Brandon and Muffie Cabot.

Layout and location

According to The Washington Post, Whitehaven is situated in an area that is "the kind of place where 'No Trespassing' signs outnumber welcome mats and where maids answer the doorbells in the afternoon" while The New York Times, quoting a local real estate broker, described it as a "quiet neighborhood" with "no real sense of community per se".

As of 2000, the year of its purchase by the Clintons, the  home had seven bedrooms and five bathrooms. From 2004 to 2007 the property was redecorated and expanded by Washington-area designer Rosemarie Howe. The main dining room can accommodate 30 dinner guests and the expansive backyard features a swimming pool.

History

Early residents

Whitehaven was constructed in 1951. Early residents included Sir David Muirhead, as well as Henry Brandon (longtime Washington correspondent for The Sunday Times) and Brandon's wife Muffie, who would eventually become mother-in-law to Bill Clinton's communications director George Stephanopoulos. 

From 1980 to 2000, the property was owned and occupied by Joseph W. Henderson, a Republican and general partner of an investment group. After the children of Henderson and his wife left home to attend Harvard University, the couple decided to sell the property and take up primary residence at their other estates in Berryville, Virginia, and Fisher's Island, New York, instead.

Clinton residency

Whitehaven was sold to the Clintons by Henderson in 2000 for $2.85 million, below the $3.5 million list price, and had an assessed value, in 2016, of $5.3 million. The purchase of the house by Bill and Hillary Clinton marked the first time a former United States president had owned a property in Washington since Woodrow Wilson.

In 2006, Hillary Clinton's mother, Dorothy Howell Rodham, moved into Whitehaven.  

Friends and colleagues of the Clintons have said Whitehaven has typically been reserved for the exclusive use of Hillary Clinton and invitations to visit the property are considered a high privilege reserved for close confidantes. Clinton used the house as a "fortress of solitude" while working on her book Hard Choices and has hosted important gatherings at the property with advisors. She reportedly made the decision to enter the 2016 presidential race, in part, at Whitehaven.

See also
 Presidential Townhouse (a U.S. government-owned house available for use by Bill Clinton and other former presidents)
 Trowbridge House (a U.S. government-owned house available for use by Bill Clinton and other former presidents)

References

Bill Clinton
Hillary Clinton
Houses in Washington, D.C.
Houses completed in 1951
1951 establishments in Washington, D.C.